Aju or AJU may refer to:

Aju (1227–1287), a general and chancellor of the Mongol Empire and the Yuan Dynasty
Aju Group (Hangul:아주그룹), a large South Korean chaebol (conglomerate), offering chemical, industry, logistic, financial, hotel and rental products
American Jewish University, a Jewish institution in Los Angeles, California established in 1947
AJU, IATA Airport Code for Santa Maria Airport (Sergipe)
Ana Jet Üs (AJÜ), a component of the Turkish Air Force

See also
Aju Gossain (c. 18th century), a Bengali poet known for his parodies of Ramprasad Sen's songs
Aju Varghese (born 1985), an Indian film actor in Malayalam cinema
Singha Sartha Aju, a merchant in Nepalese folklore